Jarle is a masculine Norwegian given name and may refer to:

People

Given name
Jarle Aambø (born 1960), Norwegian sports official
Jarle Aarbakke (born 1942), Norwegian pharmacologist
Jarle Andhøy (born 1977), Norwegian sailor and explorer
Jarle Benum (1928–2021), Norwegian politician
Jarle Bernhoft (born 1976), Norwegian musician and singer
Jarle Bondevik (1934–2016), Norwegian philologist
Jarle Friis (born 1964), Norwegian ice hockey player
Jarle Halsnes (born 1957), Norwegian alpine skier
Jarle Høysæter (1933–2017), Norwegian journalist
Jarle Ofstad (1927–2014), Norwegian physician
Jarle Pedersen (born 1955), Norwegian speed skater
Jarle Simensen (born 1937), Norwegian historian
Jarle Steinsland (born 1980), Norwegian footballer
Jarle Vespestad (born 1966), Norwegian jazz percussionist
Jarle Wee (born 1972), Norwegian footballer

Middle name
Rolf Jarle Brøske (born 1980), Norwegian politician
Oskar Jarle Grimstad (born 1954), Norwegian politician
Sjur Jarle Hauge (born 1971), Norwegian footballer and manager
Bjørn Jarle Rødberg Larsen (born 1974), Norwegian politician

Norwegian masculine given names